Bruno Martino (11 November 1925 – 12 June 2000) was an Italian composer, singer, and pianist.

Career
Martino learned to play the piano at the age of fourteen. A Jazz fan, he spent the early years of his career performing with European radio and night club orchestras. In the mid-1950s he was a member of the RAI orchestra. He later started composing music for popular Italian singers, eventually touring the world with his own orchestra. This resulted in a late-blossoming career as a singer.

Internationally he is best known for his 1960 song Estate, a standard that has been performed by many jazz musicians and singers since the early 1960s, including João Gilberto, Joe Diorio, Chet Baker, Toots Thielemans, Shirley Horn, Eliane Elias, Michel Petrucciani, Monty Alexander, Mike Stern, John Pizzarelli and Robert Jospé.

Martino's hit-song Dracula Cha Cha (later also called Dracula Cha Cha Cha) was first heard in the Italian horror-comedy film Tempi duri per i vampiri (1959) and on a vinyl single released the same year. It was later included in the album Italian Graffiti (1960/61) and is performed onscreen in Vincente Minnelli's film Two Weeks in Another Town (1962). It inspired the title of Kim Newman's novel Dracula Cha Cha Cha (1998), which takes place in Rome in 1959. There were several recordings by other artists, and Martino himself released a follow-up song called Draculino (Vampiro un po' bambino) (1959).

Discography
1959 - I grandi successi di Bruno Martino
1960 - Nuovi successi
1963 - Bruno Martino
1964 - Bruno Martino con orchestra
1965 - Dedicato a te
1969 - Sabato sera
1970 - The Best of Bruno Martino
1971 - Cos'hai trovato in lui
1972 - Ieri, oggi e sempre con Bruno Martino
1975 - I Love You
1977 - In the Night
1978 - Night Games
1980 - Il pianoforte e tu
1981 - Starai bene con me
1983 - Inconfutabilmente mia
1986 - Innamorarsi mai

References

1925 births
2000 deaths
20th-century Italian composers
20th-century Italian male musicians
20th-century Italian  male singers
20th-century pianists
Italian bandleaders
Italian jazz pianists
Italian jazz singers
Italian male composers
Italian male pianists
Italian pop musicians
Male jazz musicians